Gladesville is an unincorporated community in Preston County, in the U.S. state of West Virginia.

History
A post office called Gladesville was established in 1850, and remained in operation until 1907. The community was named for a glade near the original town site.

References

Unincorporated communities in Preston County, West Virginia
Unincorporated communities in West Virginia